The 1919 University of New Mexico football team was an American football team that represented the University of New Mexico as an independent during the 1919 college football season. In their first and only season under head coach John F. McGough, the Lobos compiled a 3–0–2 record, shut out three of five opponents, and outscored all opponents by a total of 136 to 15.

The Mann brothers, Claude (sometimes Claud) at quarterback and Grant at halfback, starred for the 1919 team. Claude was the team captain.

Four New Mexico players received first-team honors on the 1919 All-Southwest football team selected by Pop McKale for Spalding's Football Guide: Grant Mann at halfback; Dwight McClure at tackle; Glen Rogers at end; and Ben Gerpheide at fullback.

Schedule

References

University of New Mexico
New Mexico Lobos football seasons
College football undefeated seasons
University of New Mexico football